Paul Mason may refer to:

Paul Mason (author) (1898–1985), American author
Paul Mason (coastwatcher) (1901–1972), Australian coastwatcher and member of the Legislative Council of Papua and New Guinea
Paul Mason (diplomat) (1904–1978), British ambassador
Paul Mason (journalist) (born 1960), British journalist and writer
Paul Mason (footballer) (born 1963), British footballer
Paul Nicholas Mason (born 1958), Canadian novelist, playwright, and journalist
Paul Mason (sculptor) (1952–2006), British sculptor
Paul Mason (meteorologist) (Paul James Mason, born 1946), British meteorologist
Pablo Mason or Paul Mason, British author and retired Royal Air Force pilot
Paul Jonathan Mason (born 1960), Britain's heaviest man
Paul Mason (bishop) (Paul James Mason, born 1962), Roman Catholic bishop in Southwark
Paul Mason (coach), American football player and coach

See also
Paul Masson (1859–1940), winemaker